Caladenia remota subsp. parva, commonly known as the Perenjori spider orchid, is a plant in the orchid family Orchidaceae and is endemic to the south-west of Western Australia. It has a single hairy leaf and up to three creamy-white to pale yellow flowers. It has a more restricted and more westerly distribution than subspecies remota.

Description
The sepals and petals have long, brown, thread-like tips. The dorsal sepal is erect and the lateral sepals spread apart and turned downwards. The petals spread horizontally near their bases but then turn downwards. The sides of the labellum have many short blunt teeth, the tip curls under and there are two rows of anvil-shaped, white calli, sometimes with red tips, along its centre. Flowering occurs from August to mid-September.

Taxonomy and naming
Caladenia remota was first described in 2001 by Stephen Hopper and Andrew Phillip Brown and the description was published in Nuytsia. At the same time they described two subspecies, including subspecies parva. The subspecies name (parva) is a Latin word meaning "little" referring to the smaller size of this subspecies compared to subspecies remota.

Distribution and habitat
The Perenjori spider orchid is found between Perenjori and Wubin in the Avon Wheatbelt and Yalgoo biogeographic regions where it usually grows in shrublands that are wet in winter.

Conservation
Caladenia remota subsp. parva  is classified as "not threatened" by the Western Australian Government Department of Parks and Wildlife.

References

remota
Endemic orchids of Australia
Orchids of Western Australia
Plants described in 2001
Taxa named by Stephen Hopper
Taxa named by Andrew Phillip Brown